Devyani Rana is the second daughter of Pashupati Shamsher Jang Bahadur Rana and Rani Usha Raje Scindia, daughter of Jiwaji Rao Scindia, the last maharaja of Gwalior, and the wife of  Aishwarya Singh. News reports in 2001 had suggested that the Crown Prince Dipendra of Nepal wanted to marry her, but his parents did not agree, and that the refusal was the cause of the Nepalese royal massacre, although other reasons have been suggested as well.

Early life
By her father, Devyani was born as a member of the Rana dynasty. Her mother, Usha Raje Scindia, is a daughter of Jivajirao Scindia, Maharaja of Gwalior. She has one sibling, her older sister, Urvashi Khemka (née Urvashi Rajya Lakshmi).

Her paternal great-grandfather was Maharaja Mohan Shumsher JBR.

She attended Rishi Valley School in AP, Welham Girl's High School, Dehradun, Ajmer; Lady Shriram College, Delhi and Kathmandu University (MA).

Reports of Crown Prince Dipendra wanting to marry her
Dipendra was in England between 1987 and 1990, and his local guardian was Sir Jeremy Bagge, 7th Baronet, whose son was also at Eton. Bagge's daughter was a friend of Devyani who was also studying in England. Dipendra and Devyani met at the Bagges' Norfolk home, and Dipendra quickly fell in love with her and asked her to marry him. However, Dipendra's parents, and especially his mother Aishwarya Rajya Lakshmi Devi Shah (born Rana), opposed the marriage.

According to an article in the 30 July 2001, The New Yorker and other published reports, the refusal of Dipendra's parents to consent to this marriage was the cause of the massacre of the royal family in Nepal. However, a 2009 report based on an interview with his cousin Paras Shah suggested that there may have been other reasons as well, with other theories alleging that Dipendra was unhappy with the country's shift from an absolute to a constitutional monarchy, and that too much power had been given away following the 1990 People's Movement. A book, Maile Dekheko Darbar, by former Secretary to the King Birendra suggests that Dipendra may have had significant personality problems.

Post massacre
Devyani Rana fled to India immediately after the royal massacre to escape media attention. In 2004, Rana obtained a second master's degree from the London School of Economics. She was reported to have been working for the United Nations Development Programme in India in 2012. In 2014, she became Government and Corporate Affairs Director for India and the Asian subcontinent at Caterpillar Inc., and in 2021 she moved to Coca-Cola India as Vice President, Public Affairs, Communications and Sustainability for India and Southwest Asia.

Personal life
On 23 February 2007, Rana married Aishvarya Singh, the son of Bhuvaneshwar Prasad Singh and Veena Singh of Singrauli. Aishwarya is the grandson of former Indian Human Resources Minister Arjun Singh, a royal from the state of Churhat Thikana. The wedding took place at the Scindia Villa, New Delhi. 

In 2017, it was reported that Devyani Rana had become an active member of the Rastriya Prajatantra Party-Nepal (RPP-N).

Devyani Rana has one son. His name is Adidev Singh; he was born in 2010.

Portrayals
Keerthi Reddy portrayed Devyani in the 2002 Indian film Super Star, which was loosely based on the massacre.
Indian actress Pracchi Mehta Shah portrayed the role of Devyani Rana in the third season of the documentary series Zero Hour, it showed a reconstruction of the massacre taken from surviving eyewitnesses.

Ancestry

References

Living people
Delhi University alumni
Nepalese royalty
1973 births
People from Singrauli district
Mayo College Girls School alumni
Rana dynasty
Alumni of Kathmandu University
20th-century Nepalese nobility
21st-century Nepalese nobility
Nepalese Hindus
Scindia dynasty of Gwalior
Indian royalty
20th-century Indian royalty
Indian Hindus
Indian nobility